The Gold Coast District Cricket Club is a cricket club on the Gold Coast, Queensland, Australia who play in the Queensland Premier Cricket competition. The club was founded in 1990. It has won the Queensland Premier Cricket First Grade Premiership twice, in the 2002/03 and 2008/09 seasons, the competitions One-Day Premiership twice, in 1992/93 and 2009/10, and the Twenty20 Premiership twice in 2009/10 and 2020/21. They are reigning Queensland Premier Cricket T20 Champions.

History
The club was founded in 1990 to provide development for Gold Coast cricket talent and a pathway to First-class cricket. It entered Brisbane grade cricket as the Colts team had been disbanded shortly prior leaving a vacancy in the competition.

In 2018 the Queensland State Government Female Friendly Facilities Fund provided $500,000 to upgrade changing rooms for players and officials at Bill Pippen Oval, Kerrydale. In 2019 the club was shortlisted for the Australian Premier Cricket Club of the Year at the A Sport for All Awards due to its excellent development of players, creating positive experiences for the community, and pioneering women's and all-abilities cricket.

First-class cricketers
Below is a partial list of Gold Coast Dolphins cricketers who have played at First-class level or higher.
Peter Anderson
Xavier Bartlett
Max Bryant
Greg Campbell
Ross Chapman
Daniel Doran
Sam Hain
Graeme Hick
Matthew Kuhnemann
Ben McDermott
Greg Moller
Matthew Mott
Scott Muller
Michael Neser
Bruce Oxenford
Andrew Robinson
Billy Stanlake
John Stephenson
Nick Stevens
Steve Storey
Chris Swan
Andrew Symonds

See also

References

External links
 
 
 

Queensland District Cricket clubs
1990 establishments in Australia
Cricket clubs established in 1990
Sporting teams based on the Gold Coast, Queensland